Clemscott (also known as Clemscot) is an unincorporated community in Carter County, Oklahoma, United States. The community once had a post office.

Notes

Unincorporated communities in Carter County, Oklahoma
Unincorporated communities in Oklahoma